The land border of the state of Western Australia (WA) bisects mainland Australia, nominally along 129th meridian east longitude (129° East). That land border divides WA from the Northern Territory (NT) and South Australia (SA). However, for various reasons, the actual border (as surveyed and marked or otherwise indicated on the ground) deviates from 129° East, and is not a single straight line.

Border delineation
In some cases, the physical signage and structures that mark the actual border deviate from the 129th meridian.

History

1788–1825
In 1788 Governor Phillip claimed the continent of Australia only as far west as the 135th meridian east (135° east) in accordance with his commission. (26 January 1788 – MAP)

It has been suggested that the 1788 claim by the British of 135° east was in reference to Spain's claims under the Treaty of Tordesillas.  Spain was seen as no longer having an interest in the area.  On the other hand, the other signatories to the treaty, the Portuguese still had a presence in Macau and East Timor.  Adoption of 135° east as a boundary would minimise provocation of the Portuguese.  By 1825, however, Britain was powerful enough and found it convenient to adopt the original line of the Portuguese under the treaty, 129° east.

1825–29
The line of 129° east first became a border in Australia as the western border of New South Wales (NSW) in 1825 (16 July 1825 – MAP).

On 16 July 1825, the western boundary of New South Wales was relocated at 129° east to take in the new settlement at Melville Island.

From 1825 to 1829, 129° east was the NSW border, except that the settlement of King George's Sound, now Albany, was part of New South Walesand thus a semi-exclave of New South Walesfrom its establishment on 26 December 1826, until 7 March 1831 when it was made part of the Swan River Colony.

1829–32
Following the settlement of the Swan River Colony (SRC) in 1829 (2 May 1829 – MAP), the eastern boundary was declared to be 129° east, that is coinciding with the western boundary of New South Wales at the time.

The Swan River Colony, started in 1829, was commissioned as the colony of Western Australia in March 1831.

From 1829 to 1832 129° east was the SRC/NSW border.

1832–46
The name of the Swan River Colony changed to Western Australia in 1832 (6 February 1832 – MAP).

From 1832 to 1846 129° east was the WA/NSW border.

1846–47
In 1846 the colony of North Australia (NA) was proclaimed by Letters Patent, which was all of New South Wales north of 26° south. (17 February 1846 – Map).

From 1846 to 1847 129° east was the WA/NA border north of 26° south and the WA/NSW border south of the 26th parallel.

1847–60
In 1847 the colony of North Australia was revoked and reincorporated into New South Wales. (15 April 1847 – MAP).

From 1847 to 1860 129° east was once again the WA/NSW border.

1860–63
In 1860 South Australia, which had been proclaimed a colony in 1836 (28 December 1836 – MAP), west to the 132° east, changed their western border from 132° east to 129° east (1860 – MAP).

From 1860 to 1863 129° east was the WA/NSW border north of 26° south and the WA/SA border south of the 26th parallel.

1863–1911
In 1863 that part of New South Wales to the north of South Australia was annexed to South Australia by Letters Patent and became known as the Northern Territory of South Australia (NToSA). (6 July 1863 – MAP).

From 1863 to 1911 129° east was the WA/NToSA border north of 26° south and the WA/SA border south of the 26th parallel.

1911–27
In 1911 the Northern Territory (NT) was split off from South Australia to be administered by the Commonwealth. (1 January 1911 – MAP).

From 1911 to 1927 129° east was the WA/NT border north of 26° south and the WA/SA border south of the 26th parallel.

1927–31
In 1927 the Northern Territory was split into two territories, North Australia (NA) and Central Australia (CA). (1 March 1927 – MAP).

From 1927 to 1931 129° east was once again the WA/NA border and WA/CA border, both north of 26° south and the WA/SA border south of the 26th parallel.

1931–present
In 1931 North Australia and Central Australia were reunited as the Northern Territory.
(12 June 1931 – MAP).

From 1931 to the present 129° east has been the WA/NT border north of 26° south and the WA/SA border south of the 26th parallel.

Marking the WA border on the ground

History of fixing the border

Fixing the position of the border of Western Australia on the ground has a rich history. In March 1920 the Western Australian Government Astronomer, Harold Curlewis gave a talk at the WA Museum about the history of the determination of longitude, in relation to using what was at that time a new technology, by using wireless time signals to determine the position of the border between South Australia and Western Australia, as close to the 129th east meridian as possible.

WA/SA border marking history

Preliminary work on the border determinations began in November 1920 when the Government Astronomer for South Australia,  Dodwell and the Western Australian Government Astronomer, Harold Curlewis met at Deakin, Western Australia on the East-West Trans-Australian Railway.

The other members of the party were Messrs. Clive Melville Hambidge and J. Crabb, of the Survey Department; Warrant Officer V. D. Bowen, in charge of wireless apparatus lent by the Defence Department; and Mr. C. A. Maddern, of the Adelaide Observatory, all from Adelaide.

Concrete piers for the astronomical observing instruments were erected in readiness for the final determinations that were to be held in 1921. Observations were made for the purpose of testing under field conditions the instruments and methods to be used in 1921.

This expedition, to determine 129° east on the ground, created worldwide scientific interest and involved the cooperation of the Astronomer Royal and the Royal Observatory, Greenwich, with wireless time signals sent by the French wireless Service, that were transmitted from the Lyon Observatory at Saint-Genis-Laval, near Lyon, France, between 17 and 24 November 1920. Wireless time signals were also sent from the Adelaide Observatory, transmitted by the Adelaide Radio Station, to enable the beats of the Adelaide sidereal clock to be used as a control on the rate of the chronometer used for the boundary observation.

After these initial tests a comprehensive program was then arranged for the second stage of the border determinations, which were to take place during the following year and dates were then set for that to happen, from 20 April to 10 May 1921.

Deakin Pillar

Deakin Obelisk

The Deakin Obelisk was erected as closely as was possible with the technology of 1926 to 129° east.

The Deakin Obelisk has a copper plug embedded into the top centre of the concrete obelisk, which determines, on the ground, the South Australian border with Western Australia by a line drawn south to the coastline of the Great Australian Bight and north through this point to 26° south.

WA/NT border marking history

Shortly after the 1921 determinations of the border of South Australia and Western Australia, the Government Astronomer for South Australia, G.F. Dodwell and the Government Astronomer of Western Australia, H.B. Curlewis and party travelled by the State Ship Bambra to the port of Wyndham, Western Australia.

From Wyndham they were guided by Michael Patrick ("M.P.") Durack to a point he perceived as the northern boundary between his Argyle Downs Station and Jack Kilfoyle's Rosewood Station, which was also Western Australia's border with the Northern Territory or 129° east. Most of Rosewood station is in the Northern Territory but some distance further south Rosewood also extends into the East Kimberley Region of Western Australia.

From the chosen position, two concrete pillars were erected similar to those described above and portable radio masts set up, before the determinations were carried out by the scientists using the same methods of wireless time signals as were used at Deakin.

Austral Pillar

One of the concrete pillars erected, which was the one used as the point of the determinations, was marked by the expedition party to show how far east of Greenwich they were in hours, minutes and seconds, and became known as the Austral Pillar.

The Austral Pillar, the point selected for the scientific determinations of 1921 would later be found to be about 2 km east from the border of 129° east on that part of Rosewood Station, therefore inside the Northern Territory.

Kimberley Obelisk

The Kimberley Obelisk was erected as closely as was possible with the technology of 1927 to 129° east. Over several weeks during 1927, a Western Australian survey crew from the WA Department of Lands and Surveys travelled to Wyndham, then to the Austral Pillar site to set out from that point to the border, where they then erected the much more substantial Kimberley Obelisk.

The Kimberley Obelisk has a copper plug embedded into the top of the concrete obelisk, which officially determines the WA/NT border on the ground, near 129° east, by a line drawn north to the northern coastline near the Joseph Bonaparte Gulf and south through this point at the Kimberley Obelisk to the 26th parallel.

See also
 South Australia-Victoria border dispute
 Greenwich Time Signal
 Surveyor General
 Surveyor General of Western Australia

References

Borders of Australia
Borders of Western Australia
Borders of New South Wales
Borders of South Australia
Geography of the Northern Territory
History of Western Australia
History of South Australia
History of New South Wales
History of the Northern Territory
Surveying
Boundary markers